Gadget Boy & Heather (also known as Gadget Boy) is an animated television series from DIC Entertainment. The series debuted in 1995 in first-run syndication in the United States and on M6 in France.

This series is about "Gadget Boy", a bionic kid-detective with a personality similar to that of Inspector Gadget. In fact one could even consider this series as a pseudo-reboot of that franchise. He was conceived as a bionic "child" with the personality of a "perfect adult detective" (although as with the aforementioned Inspector Gadget, he is anything but). Just as maladroit as the original Inspector Gadget, Gadget Boy was usually bailed out of situations by the more practical Heather, though he was also helped greatly by his myriad high-tech gadgets and extendable arms and legs. Gadget Boy's bionic implants were installed by Switzerland-based inventor Myron Dabble (Maurice LaMarche) who has an unrequited crush on Heather. Gadget Boy and Heather receive their assignments from Italy-based Chief Stromboli (Maurice LaMarche), who, much like Chief Quimby, is a frequent, long-suffering victim of Gadget Boy's bungling. Gadget Boy is assisted by the beautiful and resourceful agent Heather (Tara Strong), a very tall equivalent of sorts to Penny (the difference being that Heather is in her early 20s). He is also assisted by a robotic dog named G-9 (Maurice LaMarche), who serves as the "Brain" of this series, which shows through his morphing capabilities to get the gang out of the stickiest situations.

The main villain of this series, instead of Dr. Claw, is the mask-wearing six-armed villainess Spydra (Louise Vallance) who is accompanied by Boris, a frequently abused, wisecracking, sarcastic vulture with a Russian accent, along with her henchmen Mulch and his twin brother Houmous, all played by Maurice LaMarche.

The main title theme song was written and performed by Mike Piccirillo. Musical underscore composers were Mike Piccirillo and Jean-Michel Guirao.

Series overview

Season 1 (1995–1996)
Raiders of the Lost Mummies (9 September 1995): written by Christian Darcy, Jeffrey Scott, Jack Hanrahan, and Eleanor Burian-Mohr
From Russia with Gadget Boy (16 September 1995): written by Christian Darcy, Jack Hanrahan, and Eleanor Burian-Mohr
Don't Burst my Bubble (23 September 1995): written by Christian Darcy, Steve Pesce, and Eleanor Burian-Mohr 
Gadget Boy in Toyland (30 September 1995): written by Christian Darcy, Steve Pesce, and Eleanor Burian-Mohr 
Gadget Boy and the Wee Folk (7 October 1995): written by Christian Darcy, Jack Hanrahan, and Eleanor Burian-Mohr
You Oughta Be in Paintings (14 October 1995): written by Christian Darcy, Steve Pesce, and Eleanor Burian-Mohr 
All That Gadgets Is Not Glitter (21 October 1995): written by Christian Darcy and Pat Allee
Gadget Boy and the Great Race (28 October 1995): written by Christian Darcy and Aubrey Tadman
Gadget Boy and the Ship of Fools (4 November 1995): written by Christian Darcy and Kevin Donahue
Gadget Boy and the Uncommon Cold (11 November 1995): written by Christian Darcy and Kevin Donahue
Double Double Toil and Dabble (18 November 1995): written by Christian Darcy, Jack Hanrahan, and Eleanor Burian-Mohr
Gadget Boy Squadron (25 November 1995): written by Christian Darcy and Kevin Donahue
My Gadget Guard (2 December 1995): written by Christian Darcy, Steve Pesce, and Eleanor Burian-Mohr 
Treasure of the Sierra Gadget (9 December 1995): written by Christian Darcy, Jack Hanrahan, and Eleanor Burian-Mohr 
Gadget Boy and the Dumpling Gang (16 December 1995): written by Christian Darcy, Jack Hanrahan, and Eleanor Burian-Mohr 
The Day the Gadget Boy Stood Still (6 January 1996): written by Christian Darcy, Steve Pesce, and Eleanor Burian-Mohr 
Monumental Mayhem (13 January 1996): written by Christian Darcy, Jack Hanrahan, and Eleanor Burian-Mohr
Jurassic Spydra (20 January 1996): written by Christian Darcy, Jack Hanrahan, and Eleanor Burian-Mohr 
Gadget Boy's Tiniest Adventure (27 January 1996): written by Christian Darcy, Jack Hanrahan, and Eleanor Burian-Mohr 
Power of Babble (3 February 1996): written by Christian Darcy and Terence Taylor
Pirate of the Airwaves (10 February 1996): written by Christian Darcy, Steve Pesce, and Eleanor Burian-Mohr 
Jaws and Teeth Too (17 February 1996): written by Christian Darcy and Jean Chalopin
Eight Hands are Quicker Than Gadget Boy (24 February 1996): written by Christian Darcy and Kyle Gaither
Boris for President (2 March 1996): written by Christian Darcy, Jack Hanrahan, and Eleanor Burian Mohr
All Webbed Up, Nowhere to Go (9 March 1996): written by Christian Darcy, Jack Hanrahan, and Eleanor Burian-Mohr 
Vulture of the Bride (16 March 1996): written by Christian Darcy, Jack Hanrahan, and Eleanor Burian-Mohr

Season 2 (1997–1998)
 The Vulture Has Landed (Neil Armstrong, 1969, Moon ) (6 September 1997): written by Steve Pesce and Eleanor Burian-Mohr
 The Long and Winding Wall (The Dragon King, China, 211 BC) (13 September 1997): written by Jack Hanrahan and Eleanor Burian-Mohr 
 For Whom the Torch Rolls (Zeus, 400 BC, Olympia, Greece) (20 September 1997): written by Christian Darcy, Jack Hanrahan, Eleanor Burian-Mohr, and Louis Gassin
 Madame Spydra Fly (Matthew C. Perry, 1853, Japan) (27 September 1997): written by Jack Hanrahan and Eleanor Burian-Mohr 
 An Ice Age Runs Through It (Somewhere in 70,000,000 BC) (4 October 1997): written by Steve Pesce and Eleanor Burian-Mohr 
 The Three Gadgeteers (The Three Musketeers, 1617,Paris, France) (11 October 1997): written by Christian Darcy, Steve Pesce, Eleanor Burian-Mohr, and Louis Gassin
 Hot Time in Old Caves (Ned The Neanderthal, 750,000 BC, Southern France) (18 October 1997): written by Kevin Donahue
 Bionic Blunder from Down Under (James Cook, 1770, Australia) (25 October 1997): written by Steve Pesce and Eleanor Burian-Mohr 
 Some Assembly Required (Henry Ford, 1909, Detroit, Michigan) (1 November 1997): written by Steve Pesce, Jack Hanrahan, and Eleanor Burian-Mohr
 Gadget-Stein (Mary Shelley, 1816, Geneva, Switzerland) (8 November 1997): written by Steve Pesce and Eleanor Burian-Mohr 
 Ice Station Vulture (Robert Peary, 1909, North Pole) (15 November 1997): written by Christian Darcy, Steve Pesce, Eleanor Burian-Mohr, and Louis Gassin
 Coming In on a Web and Prayer (The Wright Brothers, 1903, Kitty Hawk, North Carolina) (22 November 1997): written by Christian Darcy, Steve Pesce, Eleanor Burian-Mohr, and Louis Gassin
 All's Fair at the World Fair (Inventors, 1939, Queens, New York) (29 November 1997): written by Steve Pesce and Eleanor Burian-Mohr
 A Whale of a Sail of a Tail (Sinbad The Sailor, 1300 BC, Phoenicia) (6 December 1997): written by Christian Darcy, Jack Hanrahan, Eleanor Burian-Mohr, and Louis Gassin 
 An Extinct Possibility (Explorers, 1955, Africa) (13 December 1997): written by Steve Pesce and Eleanor Burian-Mohr
 A Knight to Remember (Henry III of England, 1216, England) (20 December 1997): written by Steve Pesce and Eleanor Burian-Mohr
 No Laughing Matter (Charlie Chaplin, 1920, Hollywood, California) (3 January 1998): written by Kevin Donahue
 It's Not Easy Staying Green (Hunters, 1970, Brazil) (10 January 1998): written by Jack Hanrahan, Eleanor Burian-Mohr, and Steve Pesce
 Just Fakir-ing It (Fakirs, 1928, India) (17 January 1998): written by Jack Hanrahan and Eleanor Burian-Mohr 
 Go West Young Vulture (John Sutter, 1850, California) (24 January 1998): written by Jack Hanrahan and Eleanor Burian-Mohr 
 These Are a Few of My Favorite Flying Things (Leonardo Da Vinci, 1470, Florence, Italy) (31 January 1998): written by Steve Pesce and Eleanor Burian-Mohr
 Valley of the Vulture (King Tut, 1334 BC, Egypt) (7 February 1998): written by Jack Hanrahan and Eleanor Burian-Mohr 
 The Time Land Forgot (Mayan Natives, 700 AD, Mexico) (14 February 1998): written by Christian Darcy, Jack Hanrahan, Eleanor Burian-Mohr, and Louis Gassin
 Three Brainiacs in a Fountain (Marie Curie, 1902, Paris, France, Louis Pasteur, 1864, Paris France & Albert Einstein, 1932, New York City, New York) (21 February 1998): written by Christian Darcy, Jack Hanrahan, Eleanor Burian-Mohr, and Louis Gassin
 A Gadget Boy Christmas All Around the World (Turkish bishops, 325 AD Turkey, Italians, Italy - 500 BC & Martin Luther, 1517, Wittenberg, Germany) (28 February 1998): written by Jack Hanrahan and Eleanor Burian-Mohr
 Back to the Vulture (Mrs. Dabble, 1957, Cleveland, Ohio) (7 March 1998): written by Christian Darcy, Steve Pesce, Eleanor Burian-Mohr, and Louis Gassin

References 

Lists of American children's animated television series episodes
Lists of French animated television series episodes